There are over 20,000 Grade II* listed buildings in England.  This page show the  list of these buildings in the city of Leicester.

City of Leicester

|}

See also
Grade II* listed buildings in Leicestershire
Grade I listed buildings in Leicester

Notes

External links

 Leicester
listed buildings
Buildings and structures in Leicester